Haldi may refer to:

 Ḫaldi, an Urartian god
 Haldi, Baltistan, a village in Pakistan
 Haldi, Estonia, a village
 Haldi River, West Bengal
 Turmeric (haldi in Hindi, Punjabi, Bengali, Urdu, and Gujarati), a spice

()